The Hy-Vee Classic consisted of games between Iowa's four NCAA Division I men's basketball teams: Iowa, Iowa State, Northern Iowa, and Drake. For 2012–2018, the rivalry consisted of a one-day two game event at Wells Fargo Arena each December, originally called the Big Four Classic but now known as the Hy-Vee Classic, Iowa and Iowa State playing each other in an ongoing-home and home series, and Drake and Northern Iowa playing each other regularly as members of the Missouri Valley Conference. Grinnell College was previously considered a part of the Big Four prior to their demotion to NCAA Division III athletics when they were members of the MVIAA and Missouri Valley Conference.

History
For decades, Iowa State (of the Big 12 Conference) and Iowa (of the Big Ten Conference) had home-and-home series with in-state rivals Drake and UNI, with Iowa visiting Drake in even-numbered years and Northern Iowa in odd-numbered years (with the corresponding return trips to Iowa in the opposite years) and Iowa State visiting Northern Iowa in even-numbered years and Drake in odd-numbered years. Drake and Iowa State, in particular, played in 104 of 105 seasons.

In the 2000s, Iowa State, wanting to gain a greater presence in the Des Moines area, offered and played multiple games at Wells Fargo Arena with various teams. When they offered Drake the opportunity to move their rivalry to Wells Fargo Arena, Drake declined. Iowa and Iowa State also offered Drake and UNI money to play only in Iowa City/Ames but both schools declined.

During the 2010/2011 seasons, Iowa and Iowa State began to feel pressure from losing to Northern Iowa and Drake in their non-conference schedule and to allow for more games against Power 5 conference in hopes of building a strong non-conference schedule for consideration for at-large bids for future NCAA Tournaments. Drake and Northern Iowa did not want to lose the match-ups. A neutral site concept was seen as the best for everyone involved and the Big Four Classic was born.

Hy-Vee signed on as the sponsor of the event. The initial contract ran from 2012–2015. It was later extended to 2017. As part of the 2019 extension, the event was renamed the Hy-Vee Classic.

Hy-Vee Classic
The event was held on the third Saturday of December. In 2013 the event was moved to the first Saturday of December, but attendance from students preparing for finals dropped considerably so the event was moved back to the third Saturday, although all four universities host December Commencement exercises on the day.

The event consists of two games played back to back. Initially, in even numbered years, Iowa played Northern Iowa and Drake played Iowa State. In odd numbered years, Iowa played Drake and Northern Iowa played Iowa State. The even-odd rotation was switched as part of the 2016–2019 extension. The schools also rotate hosting duties in this order: Iowa, Drake, Iowa State, Northern Iowa.

Which game is first/second and at what times is largely determined by television. Initially there was hope for both games making it to national television audiences, however this has largely been unsuccessful to date due to college football bowl games and other established basketball events on the same day nationally. The Big Ten & Big 12 have rights to the games Iowa and Iowa State respectively are played in. If both conference TV partners pass on the game, ESPN can televise through the Missouri Valley Conference's deal with the network. Otherwise, the games will air locally on Mediacom 22. In 2015, the Iowa State-Northern Iowa game broadcast on ESPNU (aided by both teams being ranked) and the Drake-Iowa game was broadcast on ESPN3 marking the first national television broadcast from the event.

Financially, the four schools split revenue 25–25–25–25. This has resulted in Drake and UNI making a much larger profit than they did, although it does come at the expense of the loss of a major home game each year. The event did not sell out in its first year, but has each year since.

In addition to the loss of on-campus home games against in-state rivals, Drake and Northern Iowa play either Iowa or Iowa State, but not both in the same season. As Drake and Northern Iowa cannot play each other in the classic due to their Missouri Valley Conference affiliations, there is no way to formally determine an official champion between the four schools in a tournament-style format.

Regular season results

Key

Round-Robin era

Hy-Vee Classic era

* indicates the number of overtime periods.

Post Hy-Vee Classic Era

Future match-ups

Iowa announced on June 14, 2018 that it was exercising its contractual right to leave the Hy-Vee Classic after the 2018 season, leaving the future of the Hy-Vee Classic in doubt.  While Iowa and Iowa State have not ruled out further participation, comments by both schools indicate that they would prefer to not play games in Des Moines and would rather play home games at each school's respective home arena.

Outright Big Four Championships by team

Big Four Classic standings by team

See also
Crossroads Classic
Drake–Northern Iowa rivalry
Iowa–Iowa State rivalry
Iowa Corn Cy-Hawk Series
Philadelphia Big 5

References

College men's basketball competitions in the United States
College basketball competitions
Drake Bulldogs men's basketball
Iowa Hawkeyes men's basketball
Iowa State Cyclones men's basketball
Northern Iowa Panthers men's basketball
1979 establishments in Iowa
Recurring sporting events established in 1979